Dolichopetalum is a genus of plants in the family Apocynaceae, first described as a genus in 1973. It contains only one known species, Dolichopetalum kwangsiense, endemic to China, known from the Provinces of Guangxi, Guizhou, and Yunnan.

References

Asclepiadoideae
Endemic flora of China
Monotypic Apocynaceae genera